Julia Kadel (born 1986 in Berlin-Kreuzberg) is a German jazz pianist and composer.

Biography 
Kadel began playing piano at the age of seven. She started out on classical piano and took up jazz at the age of fifteen. She studied psychology at Humboldt University of Berlin, then went on to study jazz piano at the Hochschule für Musik Carl Maria von Weber in Dresden from 2009 to 2014.

She led a trio with the German-Norwegian bassist Karl-Erik Enkelmann and Dresden drummer Steffen Roth. In 2014, their debut album Im Vertrauen was released by Blue Note Records/Universal. It was presented at the Überjazz Festival in Hamburg, and was awarded the first jazz prize from Hochschule für Musik Saar in 2013.

Discography 
 2014: Im Vertrauen (Blue Note), with Julia Kadel Trio (Karl-Erik Enkelmann and Steffen Roth)
 2016: Über und Unter (Blue Note) with Julia Kadel Trio (Karl-Erik Enkelmann and Steffen Roth)

References

External links 

 Hjemmeside: juliakadel.com
 Biografi på Jazzecho.de
 Tom Schulz: Die Berliner Debütantin Julia Kadel auf dem Jazz-Olymp, Hamburger Abendblatt, 16. Oktober 2014
 

1986 births
German jazz composers
German jazz pianists
German women musicians
Living people
21st-century German women pianists
People from Friedrichshain-Kreuzberg
Musicians from Berlin